This article is about the particular significance of the year 2015 to Wales and its people.

Incumbents

First Minister – Carwyn Jones
Secretary of State for Wales – David Jones (until 14 July); Stephen Crabb (from 15 July)
Archbishop of Wales – Barry Morgan, Bishop of Llandaff
Archdruid of the National Eisteddfod of Wales – Christine James

Events

9 January - Strong winds cause damage and disruption in parts of Wales, as trees are blown down, electricity supplies interrupted, and flood warnings issued.  Three children from Ysgol Gyfun Gwynllyw are injured when a falling tree hits their school bus.
31 January – The head of the Police Federation of England and Wales expresses his controversial support for all front-line police officers in England and Wales to be offered Tasers in light of the increased terrorism threat to the UK.
4 February – The ferryboat service between Dún Laoghaire in Ireland and Holyhead ends after 204 years. The boat from Dublin Port to Holyhead remains in service.
12 February - Health minister Mark Drakeford announces a ban on smoking in cars carrying children, with effect from 1 October.
26 February - Gwent Police and social services apologise for their failure to prevent three murders carried out by Carl Mills in Cwmbran in September 2012.  
6 March - Seven teenagers are arrested for dangerous driving following an accident on the A470 near Storey Arms, in which four people were killed.
18 March - A document confirming Henry Gower's consecration as Bishop of St David's in 1328 goes up for auction at Bonham's, where it is expected to fetch between £4,000 and £6,000.
31 March - Plaid Cymru launches its election manifesto in Bangor.
1 April - During a televised election debate, Plaid Cymru leader Leanne Wood tells UKIP leader Nigel Farage that he should be ashamed of himself for his comments about AIDS patients from overseas.
3 May - The Royal Mint announces the issue of a special silver penny to celebrate the birth of Princess Charlotte, daughter of Prince William and Catherine (then Duke and Duchess of Cambridge).
8 May - In the United Kingdom general election, the Conservative Party wins three additional seats in Wales:
Byron Davies wins Gower from Labour.
James Davies wins Vale of Clwyd from Labour.
Chris Davies wins Brecon and Radnorshire from the Liberal Democrats.
Jo Stevens wins Cardiff Central for Labour from the Liberal Democrats.
Liz Saville Roberts becomes Plaid Cymru's first woman MP, when she retains Dwyfor Meirionnydd for the party.
12 June - Welsh people recognised in the 2015 Birthday Honours include rugby player Gareth Edwards and composer Karl Jenkins, who receive knighthoods, and singer Michael Ball (CBE).
21 June - Nadine Koutcher wins the 2015 BBC Cardiff Singer of the World competition.
3 July
Drift mining is suspended at Aberpergwm, the last substantial coal mine in Wales.
The Abolish the Welsh Assembly Party is founded by a Bridgend businessman and former UKIP member.
20-23 August - The annual Green Man Festival is headlined by St Vincent, Super Furry Animals and Hot Chip.
18 November - Two workers are killed in an explosion at the Celsa Steel works in Splott.
1 December - Wales becomes the first nation in the UK to introduce a scheme for organ donation, whereby adults are regarded as consenting to become donors unless they have opted-out.
30 December - Power distribution companies report that 1400 homes have suffered prolonged power losses as Storm Frank affects Wales.
31 December - Welsh nominees in the New Year Honours List include actress Sian Phillips (DBE) and broadcaster Simon Weston (CBE).

Arts and literature

Welsh Awards
Glyndŵr Award 
National Eisteddfod of Wales: Chair – Hywel Griffiths
National Eisteddfod of Wales: Crown – , "Breuddwyd"
National Eisteddfod of Wales: Prose Medal – Tony Bianchi
Gwobr Goffa Daniel Owen: Mari Lisa
Wales Book of the Year: 
English language: Patrick McGuinness Other People's Countries (Jonathan Cape)
Fiction: Cynan Jones The Dig (Granta)
Non-fiction: Patrick McGuinness Other People's Countries (Jonathan Cape)
Poetry: Tiffany Atkinson - So Many Moving Parts (Bloodaxe Books)
Welsh language: Gareth F. Williams Awst yn Anogia (Gwasg Gwynedd)
Fiction: Gareth F. Williams Awst yn Anogia (Gwasg Gwynedd)
Non-fiction:  Rhyw Flodau Rhyfel (Y Lolfa). 
Poetry: Rhys Iorwerth Un Stribedyn Bach (Gwasg Carreg Gwalch)

New books

English language
Lorin Morgan-Richards - Welsh in the Old West
Meic Stephens - My Shoulder to the Wheel

Welsh language
Zonia Bowen – Dy bobl di fydd fy mhobl i
Jerry Hunter – Y Fro Dywyll

Music

Awards
Welsh Music Prize – Gwenno, Y Dydd Olaf

Albums
Catrin Finch – Tides
Karl Jenkins – The Healer - A Cantata for St Luke

Film
No Manifesto - A Film About Manic Street Preachers<ref>[https://www.theguardian.com/film/2015/jan/29/no-manifesto-a-film-about-manic-street-preachers-review "No Manifesto: A Film About Manic Street Preachers review – intelligent fan’s-eye-view", The Guardian, 29 January 2015]. Accessed 11 February 2016</ref>Under Milk Wood, directed by Kevin Allen

Sport

Athletics
29 October - Aled Davies wins his second gold medal at the 2015 IPC Athletics World Championships in Doha with a world record throw in the T42 discus to add to his shot put title won on the first day.
BBC Wales Sports Personality of the Year - Dan Biggar
Boxing
30 May - Lee Selby becomes IBF Featherweight Champion after beating Russia's Evgeny Gradovich on points in London. Selby becomes the 12th Welshman to hold a world boxing title.
16 August - Joseph Cordina wins lightweight gold at the European Amateur Boxing Championships in Samokov, Bulgaria.
15 October - In his debut fight in America, Lee Selby makes a successful first defense of his Featherweight Championship title against Mexico's Fernando Montiel.
Cricket
8 July - The 2015 Ashes series opens at Sophia Gardens in Cardiff.
Cycling
27 March - Geraint Thomas wins the E3 Harelbeke race and becomes the first Welsh cyclist to win a classic cycle race in 119 years.
13 September - Owain Doull finishes third, the highest ranked British racer, at the 2015 Tour of Britain.
Football
9 January - Cardiff City F.C.'s owner, Vincent Tan, meets supporters and agrees to a return to the traditional blue playing strip, saying his mother helped him come to the decision.
4 July - Mark Sampson leads the England women's national football team to third place in the 2015 FIFA Women's World Cup, the team's highest finish.
9 July - The Wales national football team are ranked as the 10th best team in the world, surpassing their previous highest ranking of 22nd.
10 October - The Wales national football team qualify for the final tournament of the 2016 European football championship, the team's first qualification for a major tournament finals since 1958.
9 December - Swansea City A.F.C. part company with manager Garry Monk.
Horse racing
25 April - Welsh jockey Sean Bowen wins the British conditional jockey championship, becoming the first 17-year-old to win the title.
27 December - The Welsh Grand National 2015 is postponed until January 2016 because of continuous heavy rain affecting the Chepstow course.
Rallying
15 November - Sebastien Ogier wins his third successive Wales Rally GB.
Rugby league
7 November - Wales win the 2015 European Cup, remaining unbeaten in all three matches of the tournament.  
Rugby union
22 March - Wales finish third in the 2015 Six Nations Championship, in a very close tournament that saw winners Ireland, England and Wales separated by ten points difference.
19 September - The Millennium Stadium hosts Ireland vs. Canada, the stadium's first match as part of the 2015 Rugby World Cup, the only venue to be used outside the host country of England.
17 October - Wales are knocked out of the 2015 Rugby World Cup, losing 23–19 to South Africa in the quarter finals. 
Snooker
John Higgins wins the 2015 Welsh Open. Mark Williams is the highest ranked Welsh player, going out in the semi-finals.
Table tennis
14 October – Para table tennis player Rob Davies retains his European title in the final of the 2015 European Open in Denmark.
17 October - Welsh duo, Rob Davies and Tom Matthews take gold in the team para table tennis European Championships.

Broadcasting

English-language televisionMichael Sheen's Valleys RebellionPatagonia with Huw EdwardsWelsh-language televisionDan y WenalltParchPatagonia Huw Edwards''

Births
2 May – Princess Charlotte, second grandchild of the Prince of Wales (now Charles III)

Deaths
8 January – Richard Meade, equestrian, three-time Olympic champion, 76
12 January – Paul Morgan, Welsh rugby union and rugby league footballer, 40
30 January – Howard Norris, Wales and British Lions rugby union footballer, 80
12 February – Steve Strange, singer (Visage and Strange Cruise), 55
14 February – Maureen Guy, mezzo-soprano, 82
16 February – John Davies, historian, 76
21 February – Meredydd Evans, professor, musician and television producer, 95
23 February 
John Rowlands, novelist and academic, 76
Dave Williams, footballer, 72
24 February – Roger Cecil, painter, 72 (date body discovered)
6 March – Osi Rhys Osmond, painter and television presenter, 71
11 March – Harri Pritchard Jones, author, 81
24 March – R. Geraint Gruffydd, Celtic scholar, 86
1 May – Jamie Bishop, Glamorgan cricketer, 44
3 May – Danny Jones, English rugby league footballer, 29 (heart attack)
7 May – Sir Sam Edwards, physicist, 87
12 May – Mervyn Burtch, composer, 85
18 May – Dewi Bridges, Anglican prelate, Bishop of Swansea and Brecon (1988–1998), 81
23 May – Carole Seymour-Jones, writer, 72
25 May – Moc Morgan, angler, author and broadcaster, 86
7 June – Gwilym Prichard, landscape painter, 84
10 July – Roger Rees, actor, 71 (stomach cancer)
24 July – Gordon Stuart, Canadian-born portrait painter, 91
28 July – Ernie Lewis, international rugby union referee, 91
2 August – Ken Jones, Buddhist activist and author, 85
5 August – Tony Millington, international footballer, 72
15 August – Chris Marustik, international footballer, 54
18 August – Beata Brookes, politician, MEP for North Wales (1979–1989), 84
12 September – Bryn Merrick, Welsh bassist (The Damned), 56 (cancer)
6 October – Trevor Lloyd, rugby union player, 91 (death announced on this date)
8 October – Richard Davies, actor, 89
10 October – Geoffrey Howe, Baron Howe of Aberavon, politician, Chancellor of the Exchequer (1979–1983), Foreign Secretary (1983–1989), 88
19 October – Patricia Kern, operatic mezzo-soprano and voice teacher, 88
2 November – Mike Davies, tennis player, 79
29 November
Wayne Bickerton, record producer and music executive, 74
Siân Pari Huws, broadcaster and journalist, 55
30 November – Alex Kersey-Brown, rugby player, 73
6 December – Mick McLaughlin, footballer, 72
17 December – Gareth Mortimer, musician (Racing Cars), 66 (cancer)

See also
2015 in Northern Ireland

References

 
2010s in Wales
Years of the 21st century in Wales
Wales